The Drenthe Heath Sheep (Drents Heideschaap, Dutch) is a domesticated breed of sheep originating in the Netherlands. It is raised primarily for vegetation management.

It is said to be the oldest surviving breed of sheep in Europe. Approx. 4000BCE they were introduced to Drenthe. The breed probably came with settlers from France.

References

External links
 Nederlandse Fokkersvereniging het Drentse Heideschaap

Sheep breeds originating in the Netherlands